Sandook (Marathi: संदूक) is a Marathi comedy thriller film starring Sumeet Raghavan and Bharagavi Chirmuley in the lead roles. Sumeet Raghavan is acting for the first time in a Marathi feature film. Sandook is a satirical comic thriller set in pre independence era in a small town. The protagonist Wamanrao Ashtaputre is a simple honest man who always dreams of getting rid of the British Raj. The film was released on 5 June 2015.

Cast
 Sumeet Raghavan as Vamanrao Ashtaputre
 Bhargavi Chirmule as Rukmini Ashtaputre
 Sharad Ponkshe as Shyamrao
 Arun Nalawade as Dinkar rao
Rahul Mehendale as Bhatkande
Utpal Sawant as Rajaram
Ramesh Vani as Murkute
Rahul Gore as Rana
J. Brandon Hill as Scott
 Shantanu Gangane as Banya
Mangesh Satpute as Deven
Siddhesh Prabhakar as Ganu
Divesh Medge as Bharat
Nandkumar Patil as Bharat
Ajit Parab as Tatu
Firdaus Mewawala as Billimoria

Plot
Sandook is a satirical comic thriller set in pre independence era in a small town called Sambalgarh. The protagonist Vamanrao Ashtaputre is a simple honest man who always dreams of getting rid of the British Raj. How the underdog that is Vamanrao becomes a revolutionary albeit accidentally is the core story of Sandook which is a comedy film.

Chand Tu Nabhatla
Song Artist-Swapnil Bandodkar
Song writer-Guru Thakur, Atul Kale
Lyrics-
       Chand tu nabhatala ni baavla chakor mi
       Gulaam houni tujha ubha tujhya samor mi
    Tu chanchala Tu kamini Tu padmini Tu Raagiini
      tana manaat majhiya tujhi sadaiv mohini
       urat shwas kondato uga ashi… nako rusu
      shodhu sang nemake kuthe priye… tujhe hasu
      Tu premala Tu shamala Tu komala Tu daamini
        vendhala jari tujhach chitta chor mi
        Pahat tu g malamali kovalya unhaatali
      madhal god shirshiri shaharalya manaatali
     Tu rohini Tu manini sakhe tu chaitra yaamini
       Megh paavsali tu ni chimb chimb mor mi

About Song
chand tu nabhatlaThe lyrics of this song are very catchy and meant to cheer up a depreesed person. In this song, a husband sings this song for his upset wife. Whose anger will go away after hearing this song. Hearing this song, everyone miss their lover. Listen to the rest of this song at least once.

References

External links
 

2015 films
2010s Marathi-language films
Films directed by Atul Kale